Kaitlyn Christian and Lidziya Marozava defeated Wang Xinyu and Zhu Lin in the final, 7–5, 6–3 to win the doubles tennis title at the 2022 Abierto Zapopan.

Ellen Perez and Astra Sharma were the reigning champions, but Sharma chose not to compete and Perez competed in Doha instead.

Seeds

Draw

Draw

References

Main draw

Abierto Zapopan
Abierto Zapopan
Mex